Otoide Frank Isimhmen Chineyene (born 16 November 1985), known by his stage name Rt Hon Frank D Don, is a Nigerian entertainer, comedian and actor. He currently is the Senior special Assistant to the Governor of Delta State on Entertainment.

Early life and education 
Frank D Don was born in Asaba, Delta State, Nigeria in 1985. He attended St Peters Cat. Nursery and Primary School Asaba and Finished his O level in ICE (Institute of Continuous Education) Asaba, Where letter forward his education career to Ogwashu-uku Polytechnic, where he studied Mass communication.

Comedy career 
Frank D Don's comedy career started from stage acting where he first performed Comedy at Unity Theater Production, Where he later gain a special appearance to Star Trek Show, he work alongside other Comedians and Musicians such as Kcee, psqaure, Faze, Tony one week and late Aba Ghana as the MC. Frank D Don performed comedy at the Nite of a 1000 laughs show 2009 organized by Opa Williams Other show he performed in was, Glo laffter Feast, Mnet Comedy Club in Urganda and Warri Again where he work alongside his associates Such as Igosave, Basketmouth, Bovi, Igodye Buchi, Alibaba and many others. 
His annual 10Years On Stage Comedy and Musical Show has held in Delta State.
On 6 September 2014, Rt Hon Frank D Don wed his beautiful queen  Comedian Frank D Don Declares Political Intention

Awards 
 Best Comedian of the Year 13 August 2009
 1st ever delta State Icons (Most Outstanding Comedian of the Year) 2010
 Niger Delta Award 2011 (For his Contribution to the comedy industry 2011
 South East Comedy Awardb ( As Most Creative Comedian) 2011
 Golden Groove Independence Merit Awards (for his Contribution to the Entertainment industry 2011)
 NYSC Merit Awards (as Most Creative Comedian in Asaba) 2012
 National Association of Psychology Students) NAPS As Outstanding performance in MC and Comedy 2012
 South East Entertainment Award (as the most creative comedian in the South East 2013
 National Youths Council of Nigeria / Distinguished Delta Youth Merit Award (Most Outstanding Comedian 2013)
 Peace legend Award (Fast Rising Comedian of the Year 2013)
 Delta Role Model Award (Comedian of the year 2013)
 Dspg & Beyond Ambassadorial Award (As the Most Outstanding Comedian of the Year 2014) by NADSS
 Delta Entertainment Awards (As fast rising comedian of the year 2014)

See also 
 List of Igbo people
 List of Nigerian comedians

References

External links 

1985 births
Living people
Nigerian male comedians
Nigerian male film actors
Entertainers from Delta State